Grindstone is an unincorporated community in Haakon County, in the U.S. state of South Dakota.

History
A post office called Grindstone was established in 1890, and remained in operation until 1946. The community was named after nearby Grindstone Butte.

References

Unincorporated communities in Haakon County, South Dakota
Unincorporated communities in South Dakota